These are the official results of the Men's 800 metres event at the 1991 IAAF World Championships in Tokyo, Japan. There were a total number of 42 participating athletes, with three qualifying heats, two semi-finals and the final held on Tuesday August 27, 1991.

In the final, against character, Mark Everett, in a dark blue USA uniform took the lead at the break squeezing out José Luíz Barbosa.  Along the home stretch, Johnny Gray in a white USA uniform worked his way around Barbosa and then Everett to take the lead just before the bell completing the first lap in 51.01.  Through the turn, Barbosa passed Everett, followed by Paul Ereng and eventually most of the field as Everett went backward.  As Piotr Piekarski was the sixth runner to go by Everett, he began to resist.  At the beginning of the final turn, Barbosa caught Gray and went around, followed closely by Ereng, Gray began straining, his long strides half speed to the others who were running around him.  Billy Konchellah was the next to pass Gray through the turn and sprinting wide on the outside, Everett had come back to challenge.  Barbosa had a 2-meter lead and was running along the rail for the finish, followed by Ereng.  Barbosa steadily pulled away from Ereng but Konchellah sprinting along the outside made up 5 metres and caught Barbosa 6 metres before the finish line to take the win.  Behind him, Everett came sprinting, arm flopping, past Ereng to take the bronze.

Medalists

Schedule
All times are Japan Standard Time (UTC+9)

Records
Existing records at the start of the event.

Final

Semi-finals
Held on Monday 1991-08-26

Qualifying heats
Held on Sunday 1991-08-25

See also
 1988 Men's Olympic 800 metres (Seoul)
 1990 Men's European Championships 800 metres (Split)
 1992 Men's Olympic 800 metres (Barcelona)
 1993 Men's World Championships 800 metres (Stuttgart)

References
 Results

 
800 metres at the World Athletics Championships